Thomas Hooke may refer to:

Thomas Hooke (mayor) (died 1670), Mayor of Dublin
Sir Thomas Hooke of the Hooke baronets

See also
Thomas Hook (1860–1927), Ontario real estate agent and political figure
Thomas Hook (priest), Archdeacon of Lewes
Hooke (disambiguation)